Falck is a surname. Notable people with the surname include:

 Anton Reinhard Falck (1777–1843), Dutch statesman 
 Cats Falck (1953–1984), Swedish journalist
 Enrico Falck (1899-1953), Italian entrepreneur, president of Falck Industries
 Hildegard Falck (born 1949), German athlete
 Iman Willem Falck (1736-1785), Dutch governor of Ceylon
 Isak Lauritssøn Falck (1601–1669), Norwegian land owner and timber merchant
 Jeremias Falck (1609/1610–1677), Baroque painter
 Johan Peter Falk (sometimes spelled Falck, 1733–1774), Swedish botanist
 Niels Nikolaus Falck (1784 – 1850), Danish jurist and historian
 Richard Falck (1868–1955), Prussian-born American botanist and mycologist
 Sophus Falck, founder of Falck A/S
 Wolfgang Falck (1910–2007), German Luftwaffe aviator

Surnames from nicknames
German-language surnames